KCMH may refer to:

 the ICAO airport code for John Glenn Columbus International Airport, outside Columbus, Ohio, United States
 Kaohsiung City Music Hall in Kaohsiung, Taiwan
 KCMH (FM), a radio station (91.5 FM) licensed to Mountain Home, Arkansas, United States  
 King Chulalongkorn Memorial Hospital in Bangkok, Thailand